LIM homeobox 9 is a protein that in humans is encoded by the LHX9 gene.

Function

This gene encodes a member of the LIM homeobox gene family of developmentally expressed transcription factors. The encoded protein contains a homeodomain and two cysteine-rich zinc-binding LIM domains involved in protein-protein interactions. The protein is highly similar to a mouse protein that causes gonadal agenesis when inactivated, suggesting a role in gonadal development. Alternative splicing results in multiple transcript variants.

References

Further reading